San Agustín Etla  is a town and municipality in Oaxaca in south-western Mexico. The municipality covers an area of 81.65 km². 
It is part of the Etla District in the Valles Centrales region.
As of 2005, the municipality had a total population of 3243.

San Agustín Etla is the home of the Centro de las Artes San Agustín Etla, also known as CaSa.  The town hosts a lively Day of the Dead celebration each year on November 1.

References

External links
 Centro de las Artes de San Agustin website

Municipalities of Oaxaca